Jacobi matrix may refer to:
 Jacobian matrix and determinant of a smooth map between Euclidean spaces or smooth manifolds
 Jacobi operator (Jacobi matrix), a tridiagonal symmetric matrix appearing in the theory of orthogonal polynomials